Vakıflar can refer to:

 Vakıflar, Mecitözü
 Vakıflı, Samandağ
 Vakıflar (İzmir Metro)